John Newcombe defeated Jan Kodeš in the final, 6–4, 1–6, 4–6, 6–2, 6–3 to win the men's singles tennis title at the 1973 US Open.

Ilie Năstase was the defending champion, but lost in the second round to Andrew Pattison.

Seeds
The seeded players are listed below. John Newcombe is the champion; others show the round in which they were eliminated.

  Stan Smith (semifinalist)
  Ilie Năstase (second round)
  Arthur Ashe (third round)
  Rod Laver (third round)
  Ken Rosewall (semifinalist)
  Jan Kodeš (finalist)
  Tom Okker (fourth round)
  Manuel Orantes (third round)
  Jimmy Connors (quarterfinalist)
  John Newcombe (champion)
  Roger Taylor (second round)
  Marty Riessen (second round)
  Tom Gorman (fourth round)
  Adriano Panatta (third round)
  Nikola Pilić (quarterfinalist)
  Cliff Richey (fourth round)

Draw

Key
 Q = Qualifier
 WC = Wild card
 LL = Lucky loser
 r = Retired

Final eight

Section 1

Section 2

Section 3

Section 4

Section 5

Section 6

Section 7

Section 8

External links
 Association of Tennis Professionals (ATP) – 1973 US Open Men's Singles draw
1973 US Open – Men's draws and results at the International Tennis Federation

Men
US Open (tennis) by year – Men's singles